Engebret "Embret" E. Skogen (20 August 1887 – 4 September 1968) was a Norwegian rifle shooter who competed in the early 20th century. At the 1912 Summer Olympics in Stockholm he won the bronze medal in Military rifle, three positions. He also participated in the 300 metre free rifle, three positions event and finished 31st.

He was a grandfather of Dag Fornæss, a former Olympic speed skater.

References

External links
profile

1887 births
1968 deaths
Norwegian male sport shooters
ISSF rifle shooters
Olympic shooters of Norway
Shooters at the 1912 Summer Olympics
Olympic bronze medalists for Norway
Olympic medalists in shooting
Medalists at the 1912 Summer Olympics
People from Løten
Sportspeople from Innlandet
20th-century Norwegian people